There were three hans or feudal domains in Japan called 
 Sunpu Domain in Shizuoka, Shizuoka Prefecture
 Fuchū Domain (Hitachi) in Ishioka, Ibaraki Prefecture
 Fuchū Domain (Tsushima) in Tsushima, Nagasaki Prefecture